The Hotrats (originally the Diamond Hoo Ha Men) were a cover band formed by Gaz Coombes and Danny Goffey as a side-project from their main band Supergrass. The band were named after Frank Zappa's album Hot Rats. The duo recorded a set of covers with producer Nigel Godrich for an album entitled Turn Ons in the vein of David Bowie's Pin Ups which was released in early 2010. They performed a short UK tour which included the Reading and Leeds Festivals.

Since Supergrass announced they were to split, The Hotrats have joined with Air to perform The Virgin Suicides live for the first time, over several concert dates. So far this has included an appearance at the Théâtre de la Passerelle in Saint-Brieuc, as part of Festival Art Rock 2010.

They also recorded a cover of "Under My Thumb" for the Scott Pilgrim vs. the World movie, but currently remains unreleased.

Discography

Studio albums

Singles

References

External links

English indie rock groups
Supergrass
Fat Possum Records artists
Musical groups established in 2009
2009 establishments in England